Runit Island is one of forty islands of the Enewetak Atoll of the Marshall Islands in the Pacific Ocean. The island is the site of a radioactive waste repository left by the United States after it conducted a series of nuclear tests on Enewetak Atoll between 1946 and 1958. There are ongoing concerns around deterioration of the waste site and a potential radioactive spill.

Runit Dome

Construction
The debris stems from nuclear tests conducted in the Enewetak Atoll by the United States between 1946 and 1958.

From 1977 to 1980, loose waste and topsoil scraped off from six different islands in the Enewetak Atoll was transported here, mixed with concrete, and stored in the nuclear blast crater of the Cactus test from 6 May 1958. Four thousand US servicemen were involved in the cleanup and it took three years to complete. The waste-filled crater was finally entombed in concrete.

Erosion

In 1982, a US government task force raised concern about a probable breach if a severe typhoon were to hit the island. In 2013, a report by the US Department of Energy found that the concrete dome had weathered with minor cracking of the structure.

However, the soil around the dome was found to be more contaminated than its contents, so a breach could not increase the radiation levels by any means. Because the cleaning operation in the 1970s only removed an estimated 0.8 percent of the total transuranic waste in the Enewetak atoll, the soil and the lagoon water surrounding the structure now contain a higher level of radioactivity than the debris of the dome itself, so even in the event of a total collapse, the radiation dose delivered to the local resident population or marine environment should not change significantly. 

Concern primarily lies in the rapid tidal response to the height of the water beneath the debris pile, with the potential for contamination of the groundwater supply with radionuclides. One particular concern is that, in order to save costs, the original plan to line the porous bottom crater with concrete was abandoned. Since the bottom of the crater consists of permeable soil, there is seawater inside the dome. 

However, as the Department of Energy report stated, the released radionuclides will be very rapidly diluted and should not cause any elevated radioactive risk for the marine environment, compared to what is already experienced. Leaking and breaching of the dome could however disperse plutonium, a radioactive element that is also a toxic heavy metal.

An investigative report by the Los Angeles Times in November 2019 reignited fears of the dome cracking and releasing radioactive material into the soil and surrounding water. The DOE was directed by Congress to assess the condition of the structure and develop a repair plan during the first half of 2020. The report was published in June 2020.

Illness of army personnel
Some of the US army personnel who participated in the dome construction and transport of radioactive materials claim that illnesses that developed years later are a result of having been exposed without protection. Some of these have died of cancer and others have become sick. The US government denies that there is any connection between the work on the island and the health problems and has so far refused to offer any compensation for the illnesses associated with the construction of Runit Dome.

See also
 Operation Ivy
 Ivy Mike Nuclear Test
 Ivy King Nuclear Test

Gallery

References

Enewetak Atoll
American nuclear test sites
Islands of the Marshall Islands